The following is a list of people with the name Baron. "Baron" most commonly refers to the title of nobility. The name “Baron” in old English also refers to a wealthy male landowner. In Hebrew, the Israeli surname "Bar-On" ("בר-און") is usually contracted to Baron; it means "son of strength/vigor/potency"

Surname

Ana Baron (1950–2015), Argentine journalist
Bengt Baron (born 1962), Swedish swimmer
David Baron (disambiguation)
Eguinaire Baron (1495–1550), French jurist
Fanya Baron (died 1921), Russian anarchist revolutionary
Fred Baron (lawyer) (1947–2008), American trial lawyer
Fred Baron (producer) (born 1954), American film producer
Gustav Baron (1847–1914), Croatian theologian
Hermine Baron (1912–1996), American bridge player
Hyacinthe Théodore Baron (1707-1787), French military physician
Jacques Baron (1905–1986), French surrealist poet
Joey Baron (born 1955), American jazz drummer
Krišjānis Barons (1835–1923), Latvian writer and "father of the dainas"
Leo Baron, British lawyer, contract bridge player and judge in Zambia and Zimbabwe
Lynda Baron (1939–2022), English actress
Marcelo Baron Polanczyk (born 1974), Brazilian footballer
Margaret Baron (1915–1996), British mathematics educator and historian of mathematics
Martin Baron (born 1954), American journalist and editor
Mary Joy Baron (born 1995), Filipino volleyball player
Michel Baron (1653–1729), French actor and playwright
Mike Baron, American comic book writer
Murray Baron (born 1967), Canadian ice hockey player
Naomi Baron American linguist and professor
Odile Baron Supervielle (1915-2016), Uruguayan-born Argentine writer, journalist
Piers Baron (musician)
Robert Baron (poet) (born 1630), English writer and plagiarist
Robert Baron (theologian) (1596–1639), Scottish theologian
Robert A. Baron, American business professor
Ronald S. Baron (born 1943), American money manager
Roni Bar-On (born 1948), Israeli politician
Sacha Baron Cohen (born 1971), British actor and writer
Salo Wittmayer Baron (1895–1989), Polish-Austrian Jewish historian
Sandy Baron (1937–2001), American comic actor
Simon Baron-Cohen (born 1958), British psychotherapy professor

Given name
Baron Browning (born 1999), American football player
Baron Corbin (Thomas Pestock) (born 1984), American professional wrestler
Baron Davis (born 1979), American basketball player
Baron Dickinson Webster (1818–1860), British businessman
Baron Geisler, (born 1982), Filipino actor
Baron Barrymore Halpenny, English artist, writer and historian
Barron Hilton, hotel tycoon
Andy Barron Murray, (born 1987), Scottish tennis player
Barron Trump, son of Donald and Melania Trump
Baron Waqa, former President of Nauru
Barron Wortham, American football player

Nickname or stage name
Baron (Musician) (born 1948), Trinidadian singer/songwriter
Baron (photographer), British society photographer prominent in the 1940s and 1950s

Fictional characters
 Baron Wallis / Mother's Milk (M.M.), a fictional character in the The Boys comic series
 Baron Vengeous, a fictional character in the Skulduggery Pleasant novel series

Related surnames
 Bar-On

See also
Barron (disambiguation)

Surnames of Israeli origin
Hebrew-language surnames
English masculine given names
Jewish given names
Surnames from nicknames